The 2019 Stock Car Brasil Championship was the forty-first season of the Stock Car Brasil. Daniel Serra won the 2019 season, he became three-time champion as his father Chico Serra. This was the last season with as one-make series. From 2020 Toyota Gazoo Racing will enter in the series with eight cars.

Teams and drivers
All teams compete with a Chevrolet Cruze Stock Car.

Team changes
Crown Racing joined the series replacing Cimed-ProGP in a partnership with Cimed Racing after Cacá Bueno join as a partner alongside William Lube and Duda Pamplona, owner of ProGP that left the series.
Cavaleiros Sports reduced their program from Three to two cars.
Hot Car Competições lost their longtime sponsor Bardahl after ten seasons.
After debuting in the final round of 2018, KTF Sports made their full-season debut with two cars. The team purchased the vacant space left by the departure of Squadra G-Force.
HERO departed as a sponsor after two seasons, one of which with RCM Motorsport.
Shell V-Power announced a partnership with Full Time Sports and Bassani Racing. This partnership was entered as Shell Helix Ultra.
Mico's Racing did not return for this season.
Carlos Alves Competições reduced their schedule for the season, appearing at only 5 rounds.

Driver changes
Valdeno Brito returned to R.Mattheis Motorsport-Prati Donaduzzi. Brito competed for the team from 2012 to 2016.
Galid Osman moved from Cavaleiro Sports to Shell Helix Ultra. Porsche GT3 Cup 2018 runner-up Gaetano di Mauro will race alongside Osman.
Ricardo Mauricio returned to Eurofarma RC after only one season at Full Time Sports. Max Wilson was relocated to the customer team RCM.
Third place in 2018 Stock Car Light season Pedro Cardoso made the debut in Hot Car Competições.
Lucas Foresti and Marcos Gomes left Cimed Racing Team. Foresti will join Vogel Motorsport and Gomes will race for newcomer team KTF Sports alongside Diego Nunes, who had moved from Full Time Bassani.
Marcel Coletta will be the youngest driver in the history of Stock Car. He competes the new team Crown Racing alongside Gabriel Casagrande, who moved from Vogel Motorsport
Nelson Piquet Jr. moved to Full Time Sports after one season with their customer team.
Lucas di Grassi left the series to focus on Formula E. 
2018 full-time drivers Antonio Pizzonia and Vitor Genz will not race this season.

Mid-season changes
2018 Stock Car Light champion Raphael Reis was entered with Carlos Alves Competições for some races, but the driver and team did not contest the full season.
Átila Abreu did not compete at the second round after suffering a fractured vertebra in a collision at Velopark. Porsche Carrera Cup driver Vitor Baptista filled in for him for the round at Velo Città.
Lucas di Grassi entered as wildcard in the Million Race round for Eurofarma RC.
Argentine driver Agustin Canapino raced at the sixth round as wildcard to YPF Elaion Hot Car Competiçoes. Pedro Cardoso and Hot Car broke after the eight round, in his place entered rookie driver Tuca Antoniazzi.
Marcos Gomes was replaced for 2019 Stock Car Light champion Guilherme Salas due 4 Hours of Shanghai of Asian Le Mans Series, that Gomes competed for  HubAuto Corsa.
Guga Lima lose the nine round for personal reasons.

Race calendar and results
The 2019 calendar was announced on December 20, 2018. The first round coincided with the 500th Stock Car Brazil race. The 40th anniversary of the championship was held in Tarumã. The Race of Doubles was the third round, held at Goiânia on May 19. The 11th edition of the Million Race was held on August 25 at the Interlagos Circuit. The Grand Final will also be held in Interlagos on December 15.

Championship standings
Points system
Points are awarded for each race at an event to the driver/s of a car that completed at least 75% of the race distance and was running at the completion of the race.

Feature races Used for the first race of each event.
Sprint races:The second race of each event, with partially reversed (top ten) grid.
Final race: Used for the last round of the season with double points.

Drivers' Championship

References

Stock Car Brasil seasons
Stock Car Brasil